Evsey David Domar (Domashevitsky; April 16, 1914 – April 1, 1997) was a Russian American economist, famous as developer of the Harrod–Domar model.

Life 
Evsey Domar was born on April 16, 1914 in the Polish city of Łódź, which was part of Russia at that time. He was raised and educated in Russian Outer Manchuria, then emigrated to the United States in 1936.

He received a Bachelor of Arts from UCLA in 1939, a Master of Science from the University of Michigan in 1940, a Master of Science from Harvard University in 1943, and a doctorate from Harvard in 1947.

In 1946 Evsey Domar married Carola Rosenthal. The couple had two daughters.

He was a professor at the Carnegie Institute of Technology, The University of Chicago, the Johns Hopkins University and then at the Massachusetts Institute of Technology from 1957 until the end of his career.

Evsey Domar was president of the Association for Comparative Economics and a member of several other academic organizations including the American Academy of Arts and Sciences, the Econometric Society, and the Center for Advanced Study in the Behavioral Sciences. He was on the executive committee of the American Economic Association from 1962 until 1965, and became the organization's vice president in 1970. In 1965, he was the first recipient of the John R. Commons Award, given by the economics honor society Omicron Delta Epsilon.

He worked for the RAND Corporation, the Ford Foundation, the Brookings Institution, the National Science Foundation, the Battelle Memorial Institute, and the Institute for Defense Analysis.

Evsey Domar died on April 1, 1997 in the Emerson Hospital in Concord, Massachusetts.

Work 
Evsey Domar was a Keynesian economist. He made contributions to three main areas of economics: economic history, comparative economics and economic growth. In 1946 he advanced the idea that economic growth served to lighten the deficit and the national debt. During the Cold War he was also an expert on Soviet economics.

He is most known for developing, independently of British economist Roy Forbes Harrod, what has become to be known as the Harrod–Domar model of economic growth. This model was the precursor to the neoclassical model of economic growth, differing mainly in its restrictive assumption that the Leontief production function applied, which meant there would be fixed proportions of capital and labor in production, not substitution between them. In the model, economic growth was unstable. The Solow–Swan model that followed several years later borrowed heavily from the Harrod-Domar model and used a variable proportions Cobb–Douglas production function.

Domar's 1961 paper is cited as the source of Domar aggregation, a set of rules and processes for combining industry growth data together to get aggregate industry sector or national growth.

Among his students was the economic historian Robert Fogel, who was awarded the Nobel Memorial Prize in Economics in 1993.

Papers 
 The Burden of the Debt and the National Income, 1944, AER.
 Proportional Income Taxation and Risk-Taking, with Richard Musgrave, 1944.
 Capital Expansion, Rate of Growth and Employment, 1946, Econometrica.
 Expansion and Employment, 1947, AER.
 The Problem of Capital Accumulation, 1948, AER.
 Capital Accumulation and the End of Prosperity, 1949, Proceedings of Internat. Statistical Conference
 The Effect of Foreign Investment on the Balance of Payments, 1950, AER.
 A Theoretical Analysis of Economic Growth, 1952, AER.
 Depreciation, Replacement and Growth, 1953, EJ.
 The Case for Accelerated Depreciation, 1953, QJE.
 Essays in the Theory of Economic Growth, 1957.
 On the Measurement of Technological Change, 1961, The Economic Journal 71:284 (Dec., 1961), 709–729. (jstor)
 The Soviet Collective Farm as a Producer Co-Operative, 1966, AER.
 An Index-Number Tournament, 1967, QJE.
 The Causes of Slavery or Serfdom: A hypothesis, 1969, MIT.
 On The Optimal Compensation of a Socialist Manager, 1972, MIT.
 Poor Old Capitalism, 1974, MIT.
 On the profitability of Russian serfdom, 1982, MIT. (with Mark J. Machina)
 Were the Russian serfs overcharged for their land in 1861? The history of one historical table, 1985, MIT.
 The blind men and the elephant : an essay on isms, 1988, MIT.

References

Further reading
 John Edward King, The Elgar Companion to Post Keynesian Economics, Edward Elgar Publishing, 2003, p. 372.

External links 
 Evsey D. Domar, 1914-1997 at eumed.net/Enciclopedia Virtual (shows photo of Domar)
 Inventory of the Evsey D. Domar Papers
 Reference information on Evsey Domar
 

1914 births
1997 deaths
20th-century American economists
20th-century Polish Jews
Carnegie Mellon University faculty
Columbia University faculty
Distinguished Fellows of the American Economic Association
Fellows of the Econometric Society
Harvard University alumni
Johns Hopkins University faculty
MIT School of Humanities, Arts, and Social Sciences faculty
People from Łódź
Polish emigrants to the United States
Post-Keynesian economists
Soviet emigrants to the United States
University of California, Los Angeles alumni
University of Chicago faculty
University of Michigan alumni